Reginald Thomas Kirkwood (30 May 1920 – 7 September 2006), better known as Joe Kirkwood Jr., was a professional golfer on the PGA Tour and a film actor. He started going by the name Joe Jr. in the late 1930s.

Biography
Kirkwood was born in Melbourne, Australia. His father, Joe Kirkwood Sr., was a golf pro acknowledged as having put Australian golf on the world map. In 1948, father and son both made the cut at the U.S. Open, the first father and son duo to do so (a record they held until 2004). When the younger Kirkwood won the 1949 Philadelphia Inquirer Open, they became the third father and son winners in the history of the PGA Tour. Kirkwood Jr. also won the Ozark Open in 1950 and defeated Sam Snead to win the 1951 Blue Ribbon Open in Milwaukee, Wisconsin.

In 1945, Kirkwood was invited by Monogram Pictures to test for the role of boxer Joe Palooka, a popular comic book character. He got the part and starred in Joe Palooka, Champ (1946) as well as ten additional Joe Palooka films through 1951. Kirkwood returned to the role in the 1954 television series The Joe Palooka Story.

In the late 1950s, Kirkwood, who has a star on the Hollywood Walk of Fame at 1620 Vine Street, was one of the reporters on the NBC Radio program Monitor. He also hosted a show, "Let's Play Golf", on Los Angeles station KHJ-TV.

Filmography

Personal life
Kirkwood married Joyce Woltz in 1962. His first marriage, to Cathy Downs, lasted from 1952 until their divorce in 1955. Downs and Kirkwood starred together in The Joe Palooka Story TV series from 1954 to 1955.

Kirkwood died September 7, 2006 in Hesperia, California.

PGA Tour wins

References

External links

Australian male golfers
American male golfers
PGA Tour golfers
American male film actors
American male television actors
20th-century American male actors
American radio personalities
Golfers from Melbourne
Australian emigrants to the United States
1920 births
2006 deaths